

Administrative and municipal divisions

References

Yamalo-Nenets Autonomous Okrug
Yamalo-Nenets Autonomous Okrug